"Follow the Leaders" is a song by the English post-punk band Killing Joke. It was released in May 1981 by E.G. Records as the only single from the band's second studio album, What's THIS For...!.

Release 
"Follow the Leaders" was  backed by the B-sides "Follow the Leaders (Dub)" and "Tension". It reached No. 55 in the UK Singles Chart in May 1981 and No. 25 in the Billboard Hot Dance Club Songs.

A 7" single was released by Polydor in Italy and E.G. Records in Spain,  each with a different version of "Follow the Leaders" from the 10".

Track listing 
 7"
 Side A
 "Follow the Leaders" – 4:05

 Side B
 "Tension" – 4:27

 10"
 Side A
 "Follow the Leaders" – 5:30

 Side B
 "Follow the Leaders (Dub)" – 4:04
 "Tension" – 4:28

Charts

References 

Killing Joke songs
1981 songs
Songs written by Paul Ferguson
Songs written by Youth (musician)
Songs written by Geordie Walker
Song recordings produced by Nick Launay
Songs written by Jaz Coleman
E.G. Records singles